Douglas-Hamilton is the family surname of the Dukes of Hamilton and Earls of Selkirk. The name originates from the marriage of Anne Hamilton, 3rd Duchess of Hamilton to William Douglas, 1st Earl of Selkirk in 1656. Anne was Duchess in her own right and head of the "House of Hamilton". William was a younger son of the Marquess of Douglas.

Upon the death of a cousin, the Duke of Douglas, in 1761 without heir, his subsidiary titles and the nominal seniority of the "House of Douglas", were devolved onto the 7th Duke of Hamilton.

These titles are:
Marquess of Douglas
Earl of Angus
Lord Abernethy and Jedburgh Forest

The Arms of the Head of the House are:
Quarterly; 1st and 4th grandquarters, counterquartered (i) and (iv) Gules, three cinquefoils Ermine (for Hamilton), (ii) and (iii) Argent, a lymphad Sable, sails furled proper, flagged-Gules (for The Isles (Arran)); 2nd and 3rd grandquarters, Argent, a man's heart Gules ensigned with an imperial crown proper, on a chief Azure three stars of the First (for Douglas).

Noble families
Scottish families